This is a list of defunct airlines of Barbados.

See also
 List of airlines of Barbados
 List of airports in Barbados

References

Barbados
Airlines
Airlines, defunct
Airlines